Conestogo may refer to:

Conestogo, Ontario, Canada
Conestogo Public School (see List of Waterloo Region, Ontario schools)
Conestogo Wind Energy Centre, operated by NextEra Energy
Conestogo Crown Game Preserve, Ontario, Canada
Conestogo Lake, Ontario, Canada
Conestogo Lake Conservation Area, operated by the Grand River Conservation Authority
Conestogo River, Ontario, Canada

See also
Conestoga (disambiguation)